The Voice of Greece, also known as ERA 5, is the international service of Greek state radio on shortwave and via satellite and the internet. On 11 June 2013, the Greek government announced the closure of the state broadcaster ERT from 12 June 2013 as an austerity measure.

As of 24 June 2013, The Voice of Greece from ERT Open was broadcasting intermittently again on shortwave on 9420 kHz, 9935 kHz, 11645 kHz, but the live online streaming internet transmission had not resumed. A live internet broadcast stream began operating again in mid-2015 at the link below.

History
The first state radio of Greece the "Athens Radio" was inaugurated in spring 1938 with a 15 kW transmitter at Liosia suburb and studios of the Zappeion Mansion.

The first attempt for establishing a shortwave radio station took place immediately after the Greco-Italian War broke out in October 1940. Athens Radio programmes were transmitted from a small transmitter in the centre of Athens to the front and the Balkans. A special Short Wave programme was created after the German-Italian occupation in 1947: transmissions began from a 7.5 kW transmitter to Cyprus, Egypt, Turkey, the Balkans and the Soviet Union, while four transmissions were made to Greek navigators.

The daily news bulletins were broadcast in 12 foreign languages (Arabic, German, Russian, Spanish, Romanian, Turkish, Serbo-Croatian, Bulgarian, Albanian, French, Polish, English) and once a week in Arabic. A music programme was also broadcast.

After the collapse of the military junta in 1975, the Short Wave programme was named "The Voice of Greece" and came under the then Radio News Management. Almost 15 years later, with the institutionalisation and implementation of the Unified ERT body, it became autonomous and was named "The Fifth Programme - The Voice of Greece", coming under the ERA General Management.

Profile
It is a voice that reaches the whole planet since ERA 5 transmits to 14 basic geographical destinations of the globe. The voice of ERA 5 meets no borders. It is heard in all five continents, where Greeks live, from the Balkans and the rest of Europe to Africa, Japan, the United States and Australia. It transmits at short wavelength (9420 kHz, 9935 kHz and 11645 kHz) continually for 23 hours and at medium wave for about 10 hours.

19 Greek bulletins are broadcast from the studios of ERA 5 on a daily basis. The programme also includes informative programmes of political, cultural and folklore interest, as well as musical programmes that promote good Greek songs. But ERA 5 is mainly characterised by programmes that bring it to direct contact with Hellenism through telephone calls and letters.

In parallel, ERA5 is not only intended for the Greeks living abroad, but also for foreigners living in Greece and abroad. It accomplishes this through a daily programme in many languages at short and medium wavelengths.

This programme is transmitted in 12 languages: English, German, Spanish, Russian, Polish, Albanian, Romanian, Serbo-Croatian, Turkish and Arabic.

Thus, ERA5 becomes a source of a timely and direct briefing of the various developments in Greece and the world.

The Voice of Greece is intended for the millions of Greeks living in the five continents, for the hundreds of thousands of Greek students mainly in Europe and the US, for the tens of thousands of Greek sailors at sea, as well as for the numerous Greeks living abroad, who are not speaking Greek and for foreign listeners.

The Voice of Greece has also joined the world community of the Internet with live transmission of its programme 24 hours a day. With a special programme intended for the Greeks living abroad, and with a unique and complete bulletin intended for them and with its transmission to the World Wide Web, ERA 5 reaches the Greeks living in all parts of the world.

See also
Hellenic Radio
List of international radio broadcasters

References

External links

Hellenic Broadcasting Corporation
Radio stations in Greece
International broadcasters
Radio stations established in 1938
Propaganda radio broadcasts